Petaluma Reservoir is a small, man-made lake located about  northeast of Petaluma in Sonoma County, California, United States. The City of Petaluma owns the reservoir.

In 1992, the State of California declared the reservoir unsafe in the event of an earthquake. Rather than perform a seismic retrofit of the dam, the City decided to stop using it for water supply.

See also
List of lakes in California
List of lakes in the San Francisco Bay Area

References

Reservoirs in Sonoma County, California
Reservoirs in California
Reservoirs in Northern California